The Ministry of Foreign Affairs and Cooperation, commonly known by the abbreviation MINRAFFET, is the foreign ministry of the republic of Congo.

List of ministers 
Source:
1961–1962: Otto Rusingizandekwe
1962–1963: Callixte Habamenshi
1963–1965: Lazare Mpakaniye
1965–1969: Thaddée Bagaragaza
1969–1971: Sylvestre Nsanzimana
1971–1972: Deogratias Gashonga 
1972–1973: Augustin Munyaneza
1973–1979: Aloys Nsekalije
1979–1989: François Ngarukiyintwali
1989–1992: Casimir Bizimungu
1992–1993: Boniface Ngulinzira
1993–1994: Anastase Gasana
1994............ Jérôme Bicamumpaka
1994............ Jean-Marie Ndagijimana
1994–1999: Anastase Gasana
1999............ Amri Sued Ismail
1999–2000: Augustin Iyamuremye
2000–2002: André Bumaya
2002–2008: Charles Murigande
2008–2009: Rosemary Museminali
2009–2018: Louise Mushikiwabo
2018–2019: Richard Sezibera
2019–present: Vincent Biruta

References

Rwanda
Foreign Ministers
Politicians
Foreign ministers of Rwanda
1961 establishments in Rwanda